OpenEMR is a medical practice management software which also supports Electronic Medical Records (EMR). It is ONC Complete Ambulatory EHR certified and features fully integrated electronic medical records, practice management for a medical practice, scheduling, and electronic billing.

The server side is written in PHP and can be employed in conjunction with a LAMP "stack", though any operating system with PHP support is supported.

OpenEMR is free and open-source software subject to the terms of the GNU General Public License (GPL). It is actively internationalized and localized in multiple languages, and free support is available in online forums around the world. At the time of this writing, commercial support is offered by over 30 vendors in over 10 countries.

Features 

ONC Complete Ambulatory EHR Certified
Patient Demographics
Patient Scheduling
Electronic Medical Records
Prescriptions
ePrescribing -requires OpenEMR specific integration by a third party such as what is provided by:  WENO Exchange, NewCrop, and Allscripts
EPCS (ePrescribe controlled substances) - requires OpenEMR specific integration provided by a third party such as what is provided by WENO Exchange, NewCrop, and Allscripts  
Medical Billing
Clinical Decision Rules
Patient Portal
Reports
Advantages and benefits of free and open-source software
Security
Multilanguage Support

Adoption 
In the US, it has been estimated that there are more than 5,000 installations of OpenEMR in physician offices and other small healthcare facilities serving more than 30 million patients. Internationally, it has been estimated that OpenEMR is installed in over 15,000 healthcare facilities, translating into more than 45,000 practitioners using the system which are serving greater than 90 million patients. The Peace Corps plan to incorporate OpenEMR into their EHR system. Siaya District Hospital, a 220-bed hospital in rural Kenya, is using OpenEMR. HP India is planning to utilize OpenEMR for their Mobile Health Centre Project. There are also articles describing single clinician deployments and a free clinic deployment. Internationally, it is known that there are practitioners in Pakistan, Puerto Rico, Australia, Sweden, the Netherlands, Israel, India, Malaysia, Nepal, Indonesia, Bermuda, Armenia, Kenya, and Greece that are either testing or actively using OpenEMR for use as a free electronic medical records program in the respective languages.

Awards 
OpenEMR has received a Bossie Award in the "Best Open Source Applications" category in both 2012 and 2013.

Development 
The official OpenEMR code repository was migrated from CVS to git on 20 October 2010. The project's main code repository is on GitHub. There are also official mirrored code repositories on SourceForge, Google Code, Gitorious, Bitbucket, Assembla, CodePlex and Repo.or.cz.

OEMR 
OEMR is a nonprofit entity that was organized in July, 2010 to support the OpenEMR project. OEMR is the entity that holds the ONC EHR Certifications with ICSA and InfoGard Labs.

Certification 
OpenEMR versions 4.1.0 (released on 9/23/2011), 4.1.1 (released on 8/31/2012) and 4.1.2 (released on 8/17/2013) have 2011 ONC Complete Ambulatory EHR Certification by ICSA Labs.

OpenEMR version 4.2.0 (released 12/28/2014), 4.2.1 (released 3/25/2016) and 4.2.2 (released on 5/19/2016) have 2014 ONC Modular Ambulatory EHR Certification by InfoGard Laboratories.

OpenEMR version 5.0.0 (released 2/15/2017), 5.0.1 (released 4/23/2018), 5.0.2 (released 8/4/2019) has 2014 ONC Complete Ambulatory EHR Certification by InfoGard Laboratories.

The OEMR organization is a non-profit entity that manages/provides the ONC certifications.

History 
OpenEMR was originally developed by Synitech and version 1.0 was released in June 2001 as MP Pro (MedicalPractice Professional). Much of the code was then reworked to comply with the Health Insurance Portability and Accountability Act (HIPAA) and to improve security, and the product was reintroduced as OpenEMR version 1.3 a year later, in July 2002. On 13 August 2002 OpenEMR was released to the public under the GNU General Public License (GPL), i.e. it became a free and open-source project and was registered on SourceForge. The project evolved through version 2.0 and the Pennington Firm (Pennfirm) took over as its primary maintainer in 2003. Walt Pennington transferred the OpenEMR software repository to SourceForge in March 2005.  Mr. Pennington also established Rod Roark, Andres Paglayan and James Perry, Jr. as administrators of the project.  Walt Pennington, Andres Paglayan and James Perry eventually took other directions and were replaced by Brady Miller in August 2009.  Robert Down became an administrator of the project in March 2017.  Matthew Vita was an administrator of the project from July 2017 until February 2020. Jerry Padgett became an administrator of the project in June 2019.  Stephen Waite became an administrator of the project in February 2020.  Stephen Nielson became an administrator of the project in January 2022. So at this time Rod Roark, Brady Miller, Robert Down, Jerry Padgett, Stephen Waite, and Stephen Nielson are the project's co-administrators.

In 2018 Project Insecurity found almost 30 security flaws in the system, which were all responsibly addressed.

References 

 Wallen, Jack (2011-10-11). "DIY: OpenEMR, free software for medical practices". Retrieved 2011-10-11.
 Krishna, Sreevidya (2010-11-30). "Taking medical records into the digital age - Solving traditional system challenges with OpenEMR". Retrieved 2012-02-25.
 AG (2010-02-12). "OpenEMR - At a glance". Retrieved 2010-02-16.
 Lewis, Hans (2010-01-18). "Electronic Medical and Health Records Usage Increases in U.S.: Report". Retrieved 2010-01-23.
 Shah, Shahid (2007-01-07). "Open Source EMR and Practice Management Software Appliance". Retrieved 2009-12-07.
Raj,S (2023-03-12). "Can large clinics use OpenEMR? [Top 8 challenges & shotgun solutions".

External links 

 

Free health care software
Electronic health record software
Healthcare software for macOS
Healthcare software for Windows
Healthcare software for Linux